Academy Glacier ( or Academy Brae), is one of the major glaciers in northern Greenland. 

It was named in 1892 after the Academy of Natural Sciences in Philadelphia by Robert Peary during his expedition to north Greenland.

This glacier forms the geographical limit between Peary Land and King Frederick VIII Land.

Geography 
The Academy Glacier is roughly northeast–southwest oriented and has its terminus at the head of the Independence Fjord. Navy Cliff rises north of the last stretch of the fjord beyond which lies the smaller Marie Sophie Glacier. J.C. Christensen Land lies to the east and Vildtland lies to the northwest. Gletscher Cape is a headland located east of the glacier terminus.

See also
List of glaciers in Greenland
Cartographic expeditions to Greenland
Peary Channel

References

External links
Contribution to the glaciology of northern Greenland  - UCI ESS

Glaciers of Greenland